Michael Walker (born 1967) is an American filmmaker.  He has written and directed four feature films, including Chasing Sleep, starring Jeff Daniels and Price Check, starring Parker Posey.  His films have premiered at Toronto International Film Festival and Sundance Film Festival.

Biography 
Walker graduated from New York University Tisch School of the Arts in 1989.  He also attended Stella Adler Studio of Acting in Los Angeles.  He moved to Seattle where he made his first short film, Pie Eater, which premiered at the Hamptons Film Festival in 1995. He currently lives in New York City.  His latest film, Paint, is released in the USA on December 15, 2020.

Filmography

References

External links 
 
 

People from Seattle
Film directors from New York City
1967 births
Living people
Tisch School of the Arts alumni